The Journal of Cluster Science is a quarterly peer-reviewed scientific journal covering all aspects of cluster science, including nanoclusters and nanoparticles. It is published by Springer Science+Business Media and the co-editors-in-chief are Tim Prior, Boon Teo, and Gareth Williams.

Abstracting and indexing 
The journal is abstracted and indexed in:
 Chemical Abstracts Service/CASSI
 Science Citation Index
 Scopus
 Academic OneFile
 Astrophysics Data System
 GeoRef
According to the Journal Citation Reports, the journal has a 2020 impact factor of 3.061.

See also 

 List of scientific journals in chemistry

References

External links 
 

Chemistry journals
Springer Science+Business Media academic journals
Publications established in 1990
English-language journals
Quarterly journals
Nanotechnology journals